Agustina Soledad "Sole" García (born June 12, 1981) is a retired Argentine field hockey player. She won the silver medal with the national field hockey team at the 2000 Summer Olympics in Sydney and the bronze medal at the 2004 Summer Olympics in Athens and at the 2008 Summer Olympics in Beijing. The striker was named WorldHockey Women's Young Player of the Year by the International Hockey Federation twice (2002 and 2004).

Soledad also won the World Cup in 2002 and 2010, three Champions Trophy, two gold medals at the 1999 Pan American Games, 2003 Pan American Games, and two Pan American Cups.

Since retiring from playing international hockey, Soledad has started coaching and is the assistant coach of the Canada women's national field hockey team. As assistant coach she has attended a number of events including the 2022 Commonwealth Games.

References

External links
 

Living people
1981 births
Argentine female field hockey players
Las Leonas players
Olympic field hockey players of Argentina
Field hockey players at the 2000 Summer Olympics
Field hockey players at the 2004 Summer Olympics
Field hockey players at the 2008 Summer Olympics
Field hockey players at the 2011 Pan American Games
Olympic silver medalists for Argentina
Olympic bronze medalists for Argentina
Olympic medalists in field hockey
Medalists at the 2008 Summer Olympics
Medalists at the 2004 Summer Olympics
Medalists at the 2000 Summer Olympics
Pan American Games gold medalists for Argentina
Pan American Games silver medalists for Argentina
Pan American Games medalists in field hockey
SCHC players
Expatriate field hockey players
Argentine expatriate sportspeople in the Netherlands
Argentine expatriate sportspeople in Germany
Female field hockey forwards
Rot-Weiss Köln players
Medalists at the 2011 Pan American Games
Medalists at the 1999 Pan American Games
Medalists at the 2003 Pan American Games
Sportspeople from Córdoba, Argentina